Guido Hoffmann (born 20 December 1965) is a German football coach and a former player.

Honours
1. FC Kaiserslautern
 Bundesliga: 1990–91
 DFL-Supercup: 1991

Bayer Leverkusen
 DFB-Pokal: 1992–93

References

External links
 

1965 births
Living people
German footballers
German expatriate footballers
German football managers
Borussia Mönchengladbach players
FC 08 Homburg players
1. FC Kaiserslautern players
Bayer 04 Leverkusen players
1. FC Lokomotive Leipzig players
SV Wehen Wiesbaden players
AC Omonia players
Expatriate footballers in Cyprus
Bundesliga players
2. Bundesliga players
Cypriot First Division players
Association football midfielders